

Laguna Victoria is a lake in the Beni Department, Bolivia. At an elevation of 201 m, its surface area is 25 km2.

Lakes of Beni Department